Hany Shaker (born December 21, 1952) is an Egyptian singer, actor and composer. His first public appearance was when he sang with Abd El Halim Hafez Choral Group in "Sora", then he played in the movie Sayed Darwish as the young Sayed Darwish

Biography
Hany Shaker began his musical career at a very early age – learning the piano as a child, when his mother took on the role of agent as well as supervisor of his professional training. After graduation from high school in the early 1970s he started to study music at the prestigious Cairo Conservatoire.

Hany scored his first breakthrough hit in his second year of college in December 1972 with a song written by Mohammed El Mougi, "Heloua ya Dounia (It's a Wonderful Life), which his musical set him off on his musical career.. Although at that time the biggest legends remained at their peak, Umm Kulthum, Farid al-Atrash, Mohammed Abdel Wahab and Abdel Halim Hafez they recognized his potential and supported him, so that he was able to become known among all these legends. Until today Hany claims he owes his greatest musical debt to Abdel Halim Hafez, a man who is very remarkable and who continues to exert a considerable huge influence on younger Egyptian and arab musicians even after his death in 1977.

In 1974, Hany was invited to participate in a concert in Lebanon, which turned out to be a huge success.. and ever since then Hany has remained extremely popular among the Lebanese.

From then on Hany produced a number of his early hits "Siboni Aheb" (Let me love), "Kisma w’nasib" (Destiny and fate) and one of his most popular "Kida Bardo Ya Amar" (It's not fair, oh Moon") During the 1970s Hany presented two famous Plays "Cinderella" and "Egypt".. and three romantic movies "When love sings", "We live for love" and "I love this and want that".

In the course of his long and successful career, Shaker has proved he is not only a talented singer but also a songwriter of his own material including the whole album of "Albi Maloh" which included 8 Hits in the early 1990s.. and songs such as "Ma’ak" and "Katabetli essenin" as well as working with a number of legendary composers including Salah El Sharnoubi, Tarik Akif, Yehia El Mougi, Mohamed Sultan, Baligh Hamdi, Mohamed Elmogi, khaled Elamir, Mounir Mourad, Elias El Rahbani, Ammar Elshereei, Mohamed Diaa Eldeen, Sami Elhefnawi, Hassan Abo Elsuood and Ahmed Shata.

In spite of his love of traditional Egyptian music, Hany also enjoys modern songs which reflect contemporary society. He considers his own musical style a halfway point between tradition and modernity. In the late eighties and in the nineties he started to act through his video clips including:, Lao Ya’ni, Nesyanak Sa’b, Mat Hadidish, Albi Maloh and many others.

References

External links
 
 
 

1952 births
20th-century Egyptian male singers
Living people
Singers who perform in Egyptian Arabic